Princeton School District is located in Princeton, Wisconsin. The district has one K-12 school on Old Green Lake Road in the city of Princeton.

References

External links

School districts in Wisconsin
Education in Green Lake County, Wisconsin